Radim Šimek (born September 20, 1992) is a Czech professional ice hockey defenceman for the  San Jose Sharks of the National Hockey League (NHL).

Playing career
Šimek made his Czech Extraliga debut playing with HC Bílí Tygři Liberec during the 2012–13 season.

In the 2016–17 season, his fifth with HC Bílí Tygři Liberec, Šimek led the league amongst defencemen with 11 goals in regular season. As an undrafted free agent, he agreed to a one-year, two-way contract with the San Jose Sharks of the National Hockey League (NHL) on May 23, 2017. He was re-signed by the Sharks on April 28, 2018.

On October 2, 2018, he was assigned to the San Jose Barracuda. He made his NHL debut on December 2 against the Montreal Canadiens and recorded his first career NHL point in a 5–1 win over the Carolina Hurricanes on December 6.

On December 10, 2018, Šimek recorded his first NHL goal from fellow Czech Lukáš Radil, which would be the game winner in a 5–2 win over the New Jersey Devils. On March 12, 2019 he suffered an ACL and MCL injury which kept him out for the rest of the 2018–19 season.

On March 9, 2020, Šimek signed a four-year, $9 million contract extension with the Sharks.

Career statistics

Regular season and playoffs

International

Awards and honours

References

External links

1992 births
Living people
Czech expatriate ice hockey people
Czech expatriate ice hockey players in the United States
Czech ice hockey defencemen
HC Benátky nad Jizerou players
HC Bílí Tygři Liberec players
San Jose Barracuda players
San Jose Sharks players
Undrafted National Hockey League players
Sportspeople from Mladá Boleslav